Árpád Lengyel (4 September 1915 – 30 April 1993) was a Hungarian swimmer who competed in the 1936 Summer Olympics.

He was born in Kaposvár and died in Edgewater, New Jersey, United States.

In the 1936 Olympics he won a bronze medal in the 4 × 200 m freestyle relay event. He was also fourth in his first round heat of the 400 m freestyle event and fifth in his first round heat of the 100 m backstroke event and did not advance in both occasions.

See also
World record progression 4 × 100 metres freestyle relay

External links

1915 births
1993 deaths
Hungarian male swimmers
Male backstroke swimmers
Olympic swimmers of Hungary
Swimmers at the 1936 Summer Olympics
Olympic bronze medalists for Hungary
People from Kaposvár
World record setters in swimming
Olympic bronze medalists in swimming
Hungarian male freestyle swimmers
European Aquatics Championships medalists in swimming
Medalists at the 1936 Summer Olympics
Sportspeople from Somogy County
20th-century Hungarian people